Eleni Daniilidou and Casey Dellacqua are the defending champions, having won the event in 2012. Dellacqua chose not to defend her title; Daniilidou partnered up with Coco Vandeweghe, but they lost in the quarterfinals.

Maria Sanchez and Nicola Slater won the title, defeating Gabriela Dabrowski and Sharon Fichman in the final, 4–6, 6–3, [10–8].

Seeds

Draw

References 
 Draw

Aegon Trophy - Women's Doubles
2013 Women's Doubles